Pine City is a city in and the county seat of Pine County, in east central Minnesota, United States. The population was 3,130 at the 2020 census. Part of the city is on the Mille Lacs Indian Reservation. Founded as a railway town, it soon became a logging community and the surrounding lakes made it a resort town. Today, it is in part as a commuter town for people working in the Minneapolis–Saint Paul metropolitan area.

History

The Dakota Indians were the first in the area. With the Ojibwe expansion, the area became a mixture of the two. By the early 19th century, the area became predominantly Ojibwe. They trapped and hunted on the land and traded furs at the nearby trading posts. With the 1837 Treaty of St. Peters, dubbed the "White Pine Treaty", lumbering began in the area, but was limited by access to available waterways.

In the late 19th century, European settlers came to the Pine City area, which was still heavily forested with thick stands of white pine, some of the state's largest. When the railroad arrived in Pine City, a logging expansion began. Pine City prospered and grew to have everything it needed to serve residents, farmers, and the expanding lumber industry. It was platted in 1869 and incorporated in 1881.

When Buchanan County merged with Pine County in 1861, the county seat was consolidated to Pine City because it was already well-established. Because of its location on the far southern edge of Pine County, there have been attempts over the years to move the county seat to more central Hinckley or Sandstone.

In 2005, Pine City became the first city in rural America with an annual gay pride event, East-Central Minnesota Pride. A book capturing Pine City's history in vintage photos, part of the Images of America series, was published in 2010.

Timeline
 
 1804 – European settlers arrived.
 1837 – With the Treaty of St. Peters, dubbed “White Pine Treaty", lumbering began in the area.
 1848 – The Ojibwe community of Chengwatana forms as an official village.
 1856 – Chengwatana became the county seat for Pine County.
 1872 – Two years after a fire at the Chengwatana courthouse, by popular vote Pine City became the county seat and a new courthouse was built.
 1881 – Pine City incorporated as a village west of Chengwatana due to the railroad's location west of Cross Lake.  Chengwatana declined into a ghost town.
 1894 – Pine City's Robinson Park became a staging area, a “ground zero”, for support and relief from the Great Hinckley Fire.
 1903 – James Adam Bede speaks at Associated Press annual dinner in New York City.
 1914 – A Minnesota Naval Militia Armory opened in Pine City and Minnesota Governor Eberhart gave a speech at the November dedication ceremony.
 1939 – The Village of Pine City built a yellow brick, two-story city hall but gave the building to the county, nervous it might lose its county seat status because of the need for better office space. Even so, the words “Pine City Village Hall” were carved over the east entrance.
 1952 – The towered, Romanesque Revival style courthouse building built in 1886 was struck by lightning, causing it to burn.
 1954 – In a bond issue, Pine County raised the money needed for a new courthouse and added it onto the north end of the one-time city hall (which ironically is used in part by city hall today), using the same marble wainscoting and terrazzo floors.  The words “Court House” were carved over the north entrance.
 1967 – Interstate 35 was completed through Pine City.
 1978 – First International Polkafest held here.
 1980 – Pine City's Jean Lindig Kessler was named Princess Kay of the Milky Way.
 1992 – 30-foot tall voyageur statue erected on the north shore of the Snake River, near downtown.  
 2005 – People around the region hosted first annual East-Central Minnesota Pride in Pine City.
 2007 – A few years after a failed attempt to split the county in two, a new courthouse was erected on the northern edge of Pine City near the freeway.
 2009 – The Financial crisis of 2007–2008 led to the failure of Pine City's Horizon Bank and its nearly 90 million in assets were acquired by Stearns Bank.
 2010 – Lakeside Medical Center, Pine City's hospital, closed in the midst of many rural hospital closures across America.
 2012 – June 5, with H.R.3220 the Pine City post office was renamed the "Master Sergeant Daniel L. Fedder Post Office".
 2017 – The Pine City boys' basketball team received national attention in The Wall Street Journal for their offensive philosophy to shoot primarily 3-pointers.

Geography

Climate
Below is a table of average high and low temperatures throughout the year in Pine City.  Of note, Pine City's early years included historic temperature extremes as it was the site of three record-setting cold temperatures:  
March 2, 1897 (-50 °F, March lowest temperature)
November 30, 1896 (-45 °F, November lowest temperature)
December 31, 1898 (-57 °F, December lowest temperature)

Demographics

As of the census of 2000, there were 3,043 residents, 1,222 households, and 734 families in the city.

Racial makeup (2010)
95.58% White, 1.54% Native American, 1.22% Hispanic or Latino of any race, 0.74% Asian, 0.26% African American, 0.19% from other races, 0.03% Pacific Islander and 1.67% from two or more races.

Population statistics
The city has continued to grow since it was incorporated. In fact, it is one of only three small towns in Minnesota, along with Mora and Litchfield, to have never lost population.  Much of the growth of the area occurs around the lakes in the neighboring townships, in Pokegama, Chengwatana or Pine City Township, and as of the latest census, the Pine City Zip Code (55063) had 9,348 residents.

Other demographics
There were 1,222 households, out of which 30.0% had children under the age of 18 living with them, 42.8% were married couples living together, 12.8% had a female householder with no husband present, and 39.9% were non-families. 34.7% of all households were made up of individuals, and 19.7% had someone living alone who was 65 years of age or older. The average household size was 2.38 and the average family size was 3.04.

In the city, the population was spread out, with 25.3% under the age of 18, 10.5% from 18 to 24, 25.0% from 25 to 44, 17.9% from 45 to 64, and 21.3% who were 65 years of age or older. The median age was 37 years. For every 100 females, there were 88.2 males. For every 100 females age 18 and over, there were 84.0 males.

The median income for a household in the city was $29,000 and the median income for a family was $37,000. Males had a median income of $30,000 versus $20,000 for females. The per capita income for the city was $16,000. About 10.8% of families and 15.0% of the population were below the poverty line, including 24.4% of those under age 18 and 14.1% of those age 65 or over.

Ancestry of Pine City residents is primarily German (36%), Norwegian (17%), Swedish (15%), and Czech (8%).

The 2010 Census showed the Pine City area having some of the most same-sex coupled households of any rural area of the state.

Religion

While the largest religion in Pine City is none at all, with over half of the community unchurched, it is home to various churches of varying denominations, including:

Economy

Lakeside Medical Center is one of Pine City's largest employers, with 140 employees. MINPACK, Inc. has 130 employees, and Atscott Manufacturing 100; both are headquartered in Pine City. Other large employers in the community include Walmart, Product Fabricators, Inc., Broekema Beltway, ISD 578, Therapeutic Services Agency, Pine County, Community Living Options and Lake Superior Laundry.

Downtown
The Pine City Scrapbooking Company in downtown Pine City was featured on CBS News Sunday Morning.

Arts and culture

In 2009, Pine Center for the Arts opened. It is a regional arts center offering a variety of educational and performance-based programs relating to theater, music, visual art, literature, and dance. Classes and special events take place throughout the year. Community theater is active in Pine City: the Heritage Players perform semi-annually.  The Pine City Arts Council sponsors a variety of annual events, most notably a free Friday night summer concert series held in Robinson Park and an art festival.

Promoted as "Minnesota’s Small-Town LGBTQ+ Pride", East Central Minnesota Pride's "Pride in the Park" celebration is held in Robinson Park. Starting in 2005, it was Minnesota's first small-town Pride celebration.

Major annual events
The following community and regional events are held in and around Pine City.

Spring, summer, and fall

 Highway 61 Film Festival
 International Polkafest
 Memorial Day Parade
 East-Central Minnesota Pride
 Art Fest in Robinson Park
 Pine County Fair
 Czech Booyah Festival, at Sokol Camp
 Pine City PRCA Championship Rodeo, Labor Day Weekend

Winter
 BB32 hockey tournament
 Ice fishing contests on area lakes
 Pine Technical and Community College Shooter's Association Gun Show

Places of interest

 Pine Center for the Arts
 Rural School Dist. 69 Museum
 Snake River Fur Post
 Voyageur Statue, in Voyageur Park

Parks and recreation
The city has 12 city parks, including two undeveloped parks (Cross Lake Preserve Park, Fawn Meadows Park); two passive parks, manicured but lacking recreational equipment (Meadow Ridge Park, Thomas Park); and eight active parks, with playgrounds and/or sports facilities, including:

 a community garden and a public fishing pier (Challeen Park)
 four ballfields (City Ballfields)
 three ice rinks (Hilltop Park)
 a public boat landing (Riverside Park)
 a performing stage (Robinson Park)
 a disc golf course (Voyageur Park)
 a skate park and a public beach (West Side Park)
 a Gulf War veteran memorial (Woodpecker Ridge Park)
 Pine City Country Club, a nine-hole public course that opened in 1971

Sports
The Pine City Pirates compete in town team baseball in the Eastern Minny (now North) League, part of the Minnesota Baseball Association. Amateur baseball has been part of Pine City culture for years. The Pirates have had several state appearances, including 1950, 1952 B 2nd, 1953 B 3rd, 1961, and 1962. The team was defunct for a period before being revived in 2017.

Government
Pine City is in Minnesota's 8th congressional district, represented for many years by Jim Oberstar and now by Pete Stauber. It is in State Senate District 11, represented by Jason Rarick. In the Minnesota House, Pine City is represented by Nathan Nelson. In 2019, Governor Tim Walz appointed Thom Petersen, of Pine City, to his cabinet as Commissioner of the Minnesota Department of Agriculture.

A new courthouse and county offices were relocated from downtown to the north end of town in 2007. The former courthouse was renamed Pine Government Center in 2010 and now houses city government and other community organizations, including the Chamber of Commerce.

City government
Pine City has a mayor-council government. Mayoral elections occur every two years. City council seats are contested every four years. Not all of the council members are elected in the same year, as the elections are staggered throughout odd-numbered years. The council consists of five members elected to represent the city as a whole (that is, at-large). Pine City's longest-serving mayor, and first woman mayor, was Jane Robbins.

Education

Pine City Public Schools (Independent School District #578) serve more than 1,600 students through one PK–6 elementary school (Pine City Elementary), a 7–12 Junior/Senior High School, which was named a U.S. News & World Report "Best High School", and the Pine City Area Learning Center. Pine City is also home to St. Mary's School (Catholic), which serves preschool and K–6 students.

Pine Technical and Community College is a two-year institution that is part of the Minnesota State Colleges and Universities system and offers technical and general education courses. Pine Tech's gunsmithing curriculum is one of the nation's only programs of its kind and draws students from throughout North America.

The Pine City Public Library is part of the East Central Regional Library. The ECRL holds nearly 400,000 volumes and serves over 65,000 cardholders in the region. Pine City is also home to the George E. Sausen Memorial Law Library, inside the Pine County Courthouse.

Elementary schools
ECFE/Community Education (early childhood)
Pine City Elementary School: grades K-6
St. Mary's School: pre-school

Junior high schools
Pine City Junior High School: grades 7–9

Senior high schools
Pine City Senior High School: grades 10–12
Pine City Area Learning Center (ALC): grades 9 - 12
Vision School

Colleges and universities
Pine Technical and Community College

Media

Newspapers
The major weekly newspaper in the area is the Pine City Pioneer, with a circulation of over 3,000.  The Pioneer is owned by Kanabec Publishing and edited by Traci LeBrun. Papers from the Twin Cities are also commonly read.

Television
Pine City receives TV signals from the Twin Cities. Channels include Twin Cities Public Television, WCCO 4, KSTP-TV, KMSP-TV, KARE, WFTC, and KSTC-TV.

Radio
WCMP (AM) and WCMP-FM are the two local Pine City stations.  The rest are "fringe" stations from surrounding areas.  Pine City also receives radio stations from the Twin Cities, St. Cloud, and western Wisconsin areas.

Infrastructure

Transportation

Mass transit
The Rush Line Corridor task force is studying the feasibility of rail service to serve area commuters. The Northern Lights Express passenger line has been proposed to serve area residents as well as those traveling between the Twin Cities and Twin Ports. For travel within the city, there is local taxi service.

Bus
Pine City is served by the Arrowhead Transit intra-county system. An intercity bus service, Jefferson Lines, runs from Pine City to St. Paul or Duluth twice daily.

Major highways

Pine City is along Interstate 35 between the Twin Cities and Duluth. The St. Croix Scenic Byway also passes through Pine City. The major highways include:

Rail
Pine City is on rail lines owned by BNSF Railway and leased by St. Croix Valley Railroad.

Trails
There is a planned, non-motorized trail connecting the Twin Cities-to-Twin Ports areas called the James L. Oberstar State Trail, awarded federal and state funding to connect the Sunrise Prairie Trail, near North Branch with the Willard Munger State Trail, near Hinckley.

Health and utilities

Pine City's Lakeside Medical Center has a full-service clinic and nursing home facility. Welia Health System also has a clinic in Pine City. Welia provides a variety of health care services, including family medicine, obstetrics, orthopedics, physical therapy, occupational therapy, speech-language pathology, pediatric therapies, cardiac rehabilitation, and Urgency Services. Its facility encompasses , and a freestanding emergency facility opened in 2015. Pine City also has three chiropractic clinics and More Than Sprouts, a local market featuring organic and health foods.

Utilities
Utility providers are regulated monopolies. East Central Energy provides electrical utilities to the community and is a co-op member of Great River Energy. Minnesota Energy supplies gas and US Cable provides cable television. The city treats and distributes water and several local businesses provide garbage removal and recycling services.

Law enforcement
The city's law enforcement agency is the Pine County Sheriff's Office, through contract, with 39 full-time staff including 23 sworn officers. The sheriff's office has two K-9s. Besides performing routine patrol duties, the sheriff's office performs water, ATV, and snowmobile patrol, and search and rescue functions.

Notable people

The following list includes those who were either born in, or who have resided (or presently reside) in Pine City:

 Ryan Anderson (musher) – professional musher
 James Bede – politician, US Representative 1903-09
 John "Sparky" Birrenbach – activist
 Al Blake – professional wrestler a.k.a. Vladimir Petrov, or "The Russian Assassin"
 Ben Boo – politician, mayor of Duluth from 1967 to 1975
 M. A. Brawley – politician, MN House 1876
 Louis Brouillard – priest involved in Catholic Church sex abuse cases
 Randall K. Burrows a.k.a. R.K. – politician, MN Senate 1874
 Roy Carl Carlson – politician, MN House 1975-76
 George I. Clem – politician, MN House 1947-48
 Josh Froelich – American competition shooter
 Frederick A. Hodge – politician, MN Senate 1895-98
 Jenna Jambeck – researcher 
 Dorothy Swanda Jones – Alaskan politician
 Joe Karas – politician, MN House 1949-56
 Mesa Kincaid – radio personality, KQRS-FM, WCCO-FM and KSTP-FM
 Otto Kuss – professional wrestler
 Trent Laugerman – drummer for Vanilla Ice
 Johnny Mold a.k.a. Jammin' – professional snocross racer
 Bob Mould – musician, Hüsker Dü, Sugar (American band)
 Adolph Munch – politician, MN House 1872
 Karla Nelsen – bodybuilder; 1993 AAU Ms. America
 Anna Dickie Olesen – politician, first woman to be nominated by a major party for the United States Senate
 L. C. Pedersen – politician, MN House 1919-22
 Thom Petersen – Commissioner of the Minnesota Department of Agriculture
 Jason Rarick – politician, MN House 2015–19, MN Senate (present)
 Allison Rosati – news anchor, WMAQ-TV
 Jon Rydberg – four time United States Paralympic athlete, formerly ranked #1 among US players. NCAA wheelchair basketball national champion with the University of Texas-Arlington Movin' Mavs.
 John Sayer – fur trader
 Rudy Takala – public policy commentator
 Joseph Edward Therrien a.k.a. Joe – politician, MN House 1923–30, 1943-46
 Glenn Truesdell – politician, MN House 1959-60
 Rube Walberg – professional baseball player, New York Giants, Philadelphia Athletics, Boston Red Sox
 Jeff Warner a.k.a. J.W. Storm – professional wrestler 
 Steve Zahn – critically acclaimed movie star

Fictional references
Craig Wright, best known as the writer of HBO's Six Feet Under, set a series of plays in fictitious "Pine City, Minnesota." These have been performed across the United States: The Pavilion, Orange Flower Water, Molly's Delicious, Melissa Arctic and Grace, which takes place in Florida, but is about people who come from Pine City.
Dean L. Hovey wrote a series of seven fictional mysteries set in the Pine City area:  Where Evil Hides, Hooker,  Unforgettable, Undeveloped, The Deacon's Demise, and Family Trees. Family Trees: A Pine County Mystery won the 2018 Northeastern Minnesota Book Award (NEMBA) for fiction for its depiction of the region's values, settings, and social issues.

References

Further reading

External links

Cities in Pine County, Minnesota
Cities in Minnesota
County seats in Minnesota
1881 establishments in Minnesota
Populated places established in 1881
Logging communities in the United States